Gazi Saghir Hossain (born 19 August 1986) is a Bangladeshi wicket-keeper batsman, who made his first-class debut in 2005 in the East Zone v Bangladesh Cricket Board XI game. He is a right-handed batsman.

Career 
He represented Khulna Division and Dhaka Division in National Cricket League, and Dhaka Metropolis in domestic T20 cricket Prior to that, he was also a part of the Bangladesh Under-19 squad.

In February 2005, he made his List A debut for Khulna Division. In June 2008, he made T20 debut for Bangladesh A.

Hossain has over 3500 first-class runs to his name. He has also played for the Bangladesh A team and got his first breakthrough in 2009 for the tour against West Indies. He has been drafted into the side several times as a reserve wicketkeeper, a back-up for Mushfiqur Rahim but has not played an international game so far.

References

External links 

1986 births
Living people
Bangladeshi cricketers
Cricket in Bangladesh
Khulna Division cricketers
Dhaka Division cricketers
People from Khulna